Mascarello Carrocerias de Ônibus is a Brazilian bus and coach manufacturer based at Cascavel, state of Paraná.

History
The first and only bus builder in the state of Paraná, Mascarello is part of a group of companies linked to the agribusiness sector.

It started its activities producing small models (minibuses) and gradually began to design and assemble larger models. In February 2011, it reached the mark of 10,000 units manufactured, and in May 2013, this number jumped to 15,000 units. Another important moment occurred in September 2011, when the company entered the long distance segment, when it launched the Roma 370 model.

Markets

It serves the domestic market and exports to more than 18 countries, including Chile, Ecuador, Venezuela, Costa Rica, Paraguay, and Guatemala in Latin America, as well as Ghana, Angola, and Nigeria in Africa.

Former models
Mini
Gran Mini 2003 (2003-2007)
Gran Mini 2007 (2007-2011)

Micro e Midi
Gran Midi 2005 (2005-2011) 1st Genaration
Gran Micro 2003 (2003-2010) 1st Generation
Gran Micro 2010 (2010-2013) 2nd Generation

Urban
Gran Via 2004 (2004-2008) 1st Generation
Gran Via 2008 (2008-2011) 2nd Generation
Gran Via 2011 (2011-2014) 3rd Generation
Gran Via Articulado (2010-2011)
Gran Via Low-entry (2004-2011) 1st Generation
Gran Via Low-entry (2011-2012) 2nd Generation

Road
Gran Flex (2005-2008)
Roma MD (2008-2015)
Roma 310 (2011-2015)
Roma 330 (2009-2015)
Roma 350 (2007-2013) 1st Generation
Roma 350 (2013-2015) 2nd Generation
Roma 370 (2011-2015)

External links
Mascarello Homepage (in Portuguese and English)
“Mascarello to expand production,” South American Business Information, February, 2004 (subscription required)
“Mascarello launches new bus body model,” Gazeta Mercantil, October 27, 2003 (library card access required)

Bus manufacturers of Brazil
Companies based in Paraná (state)
Companies established in 2003
Brazilian brands